Palle Hansen (born 31 August 1951) is a Danish former footballer who played as a right-back. He made one appearance for the Denmark national team in 1979.

References

External links
 
 

1951 births
Living people
People from Ballerup
Danish men's footballers
Association football fullbacks
Denmark international footballers
Denmark youth international footballers
Denmark under-21 international footballers
Kjøbenhavns Boldklub players
Hellerup IK players
Ballerup-Skovlunde Fodbold players
Sportspeople from the Capital Region of Denmark